is a small Aten asteroid first observed in 2000. It is assumed to have a diameter of approximately  – or roughly twice that of the Chelyabinsk meteor – and an assumed mass of 7.1 kg (71,000 tonnes). But the size is only known within about a factor 2. It is the largest object known to have a better than 1/1000 chance (0.1%) of impacting Earth and has the fourth highest cumulative Palermo rating at −2.79. The next good chance to observe the object will be in May 2028 when it passes  from Earth.

Because of its very Earth-like orbit and because it would have been near the Earth in 1971 (coinciding with the Apollo program), there was speculation that  might not be an asteroid but a man-made object such as an S-IVB booster stage from a Saturn V rocket which would make it about 15 meters in diameter and much less massive. (cf. J002E3, the S-IVB booster of Apollo 12 which was mistaken for an asteroid.)

Possible impacts with Earth 
Until December 2004, it was considered to have the highest (though still very low) likelihood of any near-Earth object to impact Earth in the next 100 years. It is ranked a zero on the Torino scale of impact risk because of its small size (the scale is 0–10) and is listed on Sentry Risk Table. It was briefly surpassed in December 2004 by 99942 Apophis (which at the time was known only by its provisional designation ).

Based on 31 observations of  made from May 1999 to October 2000, there is about a 1 in 360 chance that it will collide with Earth between 2069 and 2121. The greatest chance of impact is on 16 September 2071 with a 1 in 1000 chance of impact.

Planned NASA mission 
In 2008, NASA considered this asteroid as a possible target for a crewed mission (Artemis 2) using the Orion spacecraft, prior to a projected 2030 push to Mars. Those plans were since abandoned.  will be observable in May 2028 at an apparent magnitude of 19.

References

Further reading

External links 
 NASA NEO Study home page
 Piloted Orion Flight Feasibility Study
 
 
 

Minor planet object articles (unnumbered)

Potential impact events caused by near-Earth objects
Minor planets to be visited by spacecraft
20000929